Kalbsrieth is a municipality in the district Kyffhäuserkreis, in Thuringia, Germany.

History

Historical Population 
Population as of 31 December:

Data source: Thuringian Statistical Bureau of State

References

Municipalities in Thuringia
Kyffhäuserkreis